Balke is a surname. People with the surname Balke include:

Jon Balke, Norwegian jazz pianist and composer
Peder Balke, Norwegian painter
Siegfried Balke, German politician
Turid Balke, Norwegian actress, playwright, and artist

See also
Baalke (disambiguation)
Balka (disambiguation)